Acremoniella atra is a species of fungus with unknown family.

It has cosmopolitan distribution.

References

Hypocreales